Hoist Finance is a Swedish financial services company. Hoist Finance is active in 13 European countries, and specializes in the acquisition and management of non-performing consumer loans. Hoist Finance manages approximately 4 million receivables with a total aggregate face value of approximately EUR 9.5 billion and gross collections amounted to EUR 730 million in 2014. 

Hoist was previously listed on the Stockholm Stock Exchange but was de-listed in 2004. In 2003, the company divested its operations in non-performing consumer loans in Sweden but has since 2009 offered deposit accounts in Sweden (HoistSpar) and now has a total deposit base of SEK 8 billion. 

In 2012, Hoist Finance was one of the largest acquirers of non-performing consumer loans in Europe with an acquisition volume of approximately SEK 2 billion (EUR 233 million), one significant acquisition being the acquisition of the UK debt-collection agency Robinson Way Ltd. In October 2013, Hoist listed a 10-year bond for SEK 350 million on Nasdaq OMX Stockholm. A 3-year bond for SEK 750 million was listed by Hoist on Nasdaq OMX Stockholm in January 2014.

Robinson Way Ltd. marked an important acquisition in the UK market, although the sum of the purchase remains undisclosed some sources state that Hoist paid £30 million. In June 2013, Robinson Way Ltd. sold its field services division Chase Solutions to Winterhill Largo plc. The deal allows Robinson Way to focus more on its core strengths.

References

Financial services companies of Sweden
Debt
Financial markets
1994 establishments in Sweden
Companies based in Stockholm